Grete Sultan (born Johanna Margarete Sultan) (June 21, 1906June 26, 2005) was a German-American pianist.
Born in Berlin into a musical Jewish family, she studied piano from an early age with American pianist Richard Buhlig, and later with Leonid Kreutzer and Edwin Fischer. In 1933, after the nazis came to power in Germany, she was, as all Jews were, banned from playing in public and could only appear in concerts of the "Jüdischer Kulturbund" (Jewish Culture Association).

With Buhlig's help, Sultan fled Germany in 1941 via Lisbon, from where she emigrated to the United States by ship. She settled in New York City and took up piano teaching, first at Vassar College and the 92nd Street Y, then at the Masters School in Dobbs Ferry, New York. In the mid-1940s, she met the composer John Cage and became good friends with him, and it was through Sultan that Cage met one of her students, Christian Wolff, who gave Cage his first copy of the I Ching—a book that shaped Cage's composition methods during the subsequent decades.

Cage dedicated two pieces to Sultan. The first was part of his Music for Piano series, Music for Piano 53–68. In 1974, when Sultan was in the process of  learning Cage's Music of Changes, the composer offered to write some new music for her, and the result was a monumental piano cycle, Etudes Australes. Sultan made the premiere recording of the work and played it in concerts worldwide. She also performed the music of Alan Hovhaness and Tui St. George Tucker, but contemporary composers were not the only ones that interested her: in the 1940s she helped popularize Bach's Goldberg Variations, and her concert programs included music from Beethoven, Chopin, and Schubert to Stravinsky, Earle Brown and Morton Feldman.

Grete Sultan gave her last recital in 1996, aged 90, at New York's Merkin Concert Hall, performing Bach's  Goldberg Variations. She died in a Manhattan hospital five days after her 99th birthday. In spring 2012, Schott Music, Germany, published the first biography on Grete Sultan, titled "Rebellische Pianistin. Das Leben der Grete Sultan zwischen Berlin und New York", written by Hamburg-based author Moritz von Bredow.

Discography
 John Cage: Etudes Australes {Wergo 60152/55 (Edition John Cage)}
 "Grete Sultan - The Legacy, Vol. 1": Bach (Goldberg-Variations), Debussy, Schoenberg and Cage {Concord 42030}
 "Grete Sultan - The Legacy, Vol. 2": Beethoven (Diabelli Variations), Copland, Wolpe, Hovhaness, Cage u.a. {Labor 7038-2}
 Grete Sultan - Piano Seasons (1-Bach; 2-Beethoven; 3-Schubert/Schumann; 4-Schönberg/Copland/Weber/Wolpe/Hovhaness/Cage/Ichiyanagi) {Wergo WER 40432, 4 CDs}

References
 Bredow, Moritz von. 2012. "Rebellische Pianistin. Das Leben der Grete Sultan zwischen Berlin und New York." (Biography). Schott Music, Mainz, Germany. 
 
 
 Kostelanetz, Richard. 2003. Conversing with John Cage. New York: Routledge. 
 Revill, David. 1993. The Roaring Silence: John Cage – a Life. Arcade Publishing. ,

Notes

American classical pianists
American women classical pianists
German classical pianists
German women pianists
American people of German-Jewish descent
Jewish emigrants from Nazi Germany to the United States
Vassar College faculty
Jewish classical pianists
Musicians from Berlin
Musicians from New York City
1906 births
2005 deaths
Contemporary classical music performers
Officers Crosses of the Order of Merit of the Federal Republic of Germany
20th-century classical pianists
20th-century German musicians
20th-century American pianists
20th-century American women pianists
Classical musicians from New York (state)
American women academics
20th-century German women
21st-century American women